João Miguel Teixeira Mendes (born 13 April 2000) is a Portuguese professional footballer who plays as a defender for Porto.

Career statistics

Club

Notes

References

2000 births
Living people
People from Marco de Canaveses
Portuguese footballers
Association football defenders
Campeonato de Portugal (league) players
Liga Portugal 2 players
Primeira Liga players
F.C. Penafiel players
Vitória S.C. players
Vitória S.C. B players
FC Porto players
FC Porto B players
Sportspeople from Porto District